Thurrock was a local government district and civil parish in south Essex, England from 1936 to 1974.

The parish and urban district was formed from the former area of the following civil parishes which had been abolished in 1936:

From Grays Thurrock Urban District:
Grays Thurrock
From Orsett Rural District:
Bulphan
Corringham
East Tilbury
Fobbing
Horndon-on-the-Hill
Langdon Hills
Little Thurrock
Mucking
North Ockendon (part)
Orsett
Stanford-le-Hope
Stifford
West Tilbury
From Purfleet Urban District:
Aveley
South Ockendon
West Thurrock
From Tilbury Urban District:
Chadwell St Mary

The district was enlarged in 1938 by gaining part of the former Little Burstead parish from Billericay Urban District. The district was abolished in 1974.  The part within Basildon New Town became part of Basildon District, while the remainder became the present-day Borough of Thurrock.  It has since become a unitary authority with largely the same boundaries.

References

External links
Historic boundaries - A Vision of Britain
 Unit data - A Vision of Britain

Districts of England abolished by the Local Government Act 1972
History of Thurrock
Urban districts of England